Djurgårdens IF Fotbollsförening – commonly known as Djurgårdens IF, Djurgården Fotboll (official name), Djurgården, and (especially locally) Djurgår'n, Dif or DIF – is the men's association football department of its parent association Djurgårdens IF. Founded 1891 on the island of Djurgården, the club's home ground is Tele2 Arena, situated in the Johanneshov district of Stockholm.

Competing in the highest Swedish tier, Allsvenskan, the club has won the league twelve times and the cup five times. The league titles have mainly been won during three separate eras. The first period was the 1910s, when the team won four league titles. The second era occurred in the 1950s and 1960s, when Djurgården won the league four times. The most recent era was the first during half of the 2000s, when they won both the league and the cup three times. From 2017 to the current day, the club has seen a boom, both nationally and internationally, highlighted by the Svenska Cupen title in 2018, the league title in 2019, and their qualification to 2022–23 Europa Conference League round of 16.

Supporters of the club, called djurgårdare, are found in all socio-economic spheres and throughout all areas of Stockholm and, to some extent, all over Sweden. However, East Vasastan and Östermalm, the latter in particular where Djurgården's former home ground Stadion is situated, is by some considered the club's heartland. Djurgården is affiliated to the Stockholms Fotbollförbund.

History

Foundation
Djurgårdens IF was founded primarily by John G. Jansson, on 12 March 1891, at a café in Alberget 4A in the island Djurgården in central Stockholm. Most of the founding members were from the dockyard-industry working class, an identity that stayed true up until the 1940s and 1950s.

The club originally focused on winter sports and athletics. The first true football field in Stockholm was created in 1896. Djurgårdens IF's football section was formed in 1899 with the help of former GAIS player Teodor Andersson. Djurgården played their first match in July 1899, a 1–2 loss against AIK.

First era

The team's first real achievement was made in 1902 when the team finished second in the Rosenska Pokalen tournament. Just two years later, in 1904, the club participated in its first Svenska Mästerskapet final, ending in a defeat against Örgryte IS. The team lost three more finals before the first Swedish Championship victory came in the 1912 final. The club won three more Swedish Championships in the early years, the 1915 final against Örgryte, the 1917 final against AIK. and the 1920 final against IK Sleipner, and played a total of twelve finals in the 30 editions that was played of the championship. Bertil Nordenskjöld and Ragnar Wicksell were part of the champion squad all four finals, and Gottfrid Johansson, Einar Olsson and Sten Söderberg in three of them. However, Djurgården never managed to win Svenska Serien, the top Swedish league of the period, before the club's first great era ended. In 1910, the first Djurgården players were selected for the national team, Ivar Friberg, Erik Lavass, Samuel Lindqvist, and Bertil Nordenskjöld played a friendly against Norway on 11 September 1910. Between 1911 and 1935, Tranebergs IP was the homeground for Djurgården. For the 1912 Summer Olympics, Stockholms Stadion was built. It became Djurgården's permanent home ground in 1936.

The club did not qualify for the first season of Allsvenskan, and only reached that league twice between 1924 and 1944, both times being directly relegated back down to the second tier Division 2. The club did also play three seasons in the then third highest league, Division 3, between 1929 and 1932. From 1944 on, Djurgården became a stable Allsvenskan team. In 1951, the team became runners-up in Svenska Cupen after Malmö FF; this was the team's first Cup final.

Second era

The second great era took place in the 1950s and 1960s, winning Allsvenskan four times during the period. Djurgården's fifth Swedish championships, and first Allsvenskan win, was taken in the 1954–55 season under the lead of Frank Soo. In the 1955–56 season, Djurgården became the first Swedish team to enter the European Cup. Beating Gwardia Warszawa in the first round, Djurgården advanced to quarter finals against Scottish Hibernian that they lost by 1–4 over two matches.

In 1959, both the football team and Djurgårdens IF's hockey team won their respective Swedish Championships of Sweden's two most popular sports, a remarkable happening. The 1959 title was secured on Råsunda Stadium, in front of 48,894 people, marking a record attendance for Djurgården, with a team of Sven Tumba, Birger Eklund, Lars Broström, John Eriksson, Hans Karlsson, Gösta Sandberg, Olle Hellström, Stig Gustafsson, Arne Arvidsson, Hans Mild and Sigge Parling.

The year after, in the 1960 season Djurgården finished 11th and therefore was relegated to the second division. The team only needed one year to return to Allsvenskan. In 1964 and 1966, Djurgården took its seventh and eight championships, with 1966 marking the end of the career of Gösta Sandberg. Sandberg played 322 league matches for the team 1951–66 and scored 77 goals. Gösta Sandberg is known as "Mr Djurgården" and was in 1991 named "Djurgårdare of the century". Sandberg also played for the club's Bandy and Ice Hockey section. He died on his way home after attending the Tvillingderbyt in 2006.

It is during this era that the nickname "Järnkaminerna" ("The Iron Furnaces") was established, due to the club's physical playing style. The ideal of a strong and uncompromising Djurgården player might also be traced back to the club's working-class roots.

Middle years
The 1970s saw no greater successes; however, Djurgården was steady in Allsvenskan and had three third-places and a final loss in the 1975 Svenska Cupen Final as the best results. Gary Williams became the first foreign player in the team in the 1977 season.

The 1980s was not a good decade for the club, being relegated from Allsvenskan in 1981, and losing two promotion play-offs, before making a one-year visit in the highest league in 1986, although DIF returned two years later, and stayed in Allsvenskan for five consecutive seasons, but had no greater success except losing the Championship final in 1988. In 1987, Djurgårdens IF Fotboll presented a 12 million Swedish krona deficit and later transformed into an aktiebolag. Former England striker Teddy Sheringham had a brief spell at Djurgården early in his career, as a 19-year-old loanee in 1985, and was part of the squad that won the promotion to Allsvenskan after beating GAIS in a dramatic penalty shoot-out in the playoffs.

The 1990s started off well for Djurgården and in 1990 the team won the Svenska Cupen (Swedish Cup) for the first time and took Djurgårdens biggest ever win when they defeated local rival Hammarby with 9–1 in Allsvenskan on 13 August. Although Djurgården undisputedly had a promising start of the 1990s the rest of the decade was not particularly successful and Djurgården was relegated from Allsvenskan no less than three times, and promoted back two times. During this decade, the club suffered from great economic problems and was close to bankruptcy. The 1995 season started well, but ended badly; in the last home match of the 1995 Allsvenskan, a supporter, later named Terror-Tommy in media, came on pitch and kicked referee Anders Frisk.

Third era

In the middle of 1999 season, Zoran Lukic and Sören Åkeby took over the team and won the inaugural 2000 Superettan, and finished 2nd as newly promoted in the 2001 Allsvenskan. With a team consisting of Stefan Rehn, Kim Källström, Andreas Johansson, and Andreas Isaksson, Djurgården secured its first title in 36 years in the last round of the 2002 Allsvenskan. The first half of the 2000s was a golden era for the club, with three championships (2002, 2003 and 2005) and three cup wins (2002, 2004 and 2005). This marked the end of the golden era for Djurgården, which ended on sixth place in 2006. The club was one of the main contenders for the league championship in 2007, which ultimately led to a third place. The golden era saw the club play against European clubs Juventus, FC Girondins de Bordeaux, Shamrock Rovers F.C., FK Partizan and FC Utrecht. The most remarkable result being the 2–2 draw away against Juventus at Stadio Delle Alpi.

The difficult years
The results went downhill in 2008 and 2009; Djurgården ended up in 14th place in 2009 and had to play through a relegation playoff against Assyriska Föreningen to remain in Allsvenskan. In the early 2010s, Djurgården was a mid-table Allsvenskan team finishing 7th to 11th between 2010 and 2014. When the newly appointed director of sport Bo Andersson who led Djurgården to three titles in the early 21st century came back in 2014 he was forced to sell players such as Daniel Amartey (who became the most expensive defender ever sold by an Allsvenskan club for about 25 million SEK), Erton Fejzullahu, Christian Rubio Sivodedov and Simon Tibbling which stabilized the economy.

The start of something new 

In January 2017, Djurgården sold the Kenyan international forward Michael Olunga for a club record fee of 40 million SEK which made the club's financial positions one of the best in the country. The transfer also made it possible to sign club legend Kim Källström and fellow former Swedish international Jonas Olsson. Both players, together with recently returned goalkeeper Andreas Isaksson, played important roles as Djurgården finished in third place in the 2017 Allsvenskan, qualifying for the second qualifying round for the 2018–19 UEFA Europa League for the first time in ten years.

After 13 years without a title Djurgården won the Svenska Cupen (Swedish Cup) on 10 May 2018 going through the Cup scoring 14 goals and not conceding a single goal. They defeated Malmö FF 3–0 in a thrilling final at Tele2 Arena, impressive considering the poor form they had in the league before the game.

A new era 

In 2019 they won the league title for the first time in fourteen years (2005). They secured the title and a spot in the UEFA Champions League 3rd Qualifying round, on the last day of the season after a 2–2 draw (after being down 2–0 at half time) away from home against IFK Norrköping. After the season Djurgården sold defender and team captain Marcus Danielsson to the Chinese club Dalian Professional based in for what was reported a club record fee of more than 50 million SEK. This made Djurgården one of Sweden's wealthiest clubs along with various other sales.

The club ended up in fourth place in the 2020 campaign. Highly affected by the COVID-19 pandemic, the start of the season was significantly delayed, and all the games were played with no spectators allowed in the stands.

In 2021 the club ended third in the league, thereby winning a spot in the second qualifying round of the UEFA Europa Conference League. Djurgården also reached the knockout stage of the Svenska Cupen (Swedish Cup) and eventually the semi-finals, where they lost to Malmö FF.

Their 2022–23 UEFA Europa Conference League journey began in the second qualifying round against Rijeka who they defeated 4–1 on aggregate over the two games. With this they advanced to the third qualifying round where they were drawn against the Romanian Cup winners Sepsi OSK, who they managed to beat 6–2 over the two legs. Finally, they were then drawn against the experienced Cypriot campaigners APOEL in the play-off round. The two-legged fixture ended 5–3 in favour of Djurgården, and with this they qualified for the group stages of a European tournament for the first time in club history. They were subsequently drawn into group F alongside Belgian Cup winners Gent, Irish champions Shamrock Rovers and Norwegian neighbours Molde, with whom they had a Nordic derby.

Djurgården secured at least 3.2 million Euros for qualifying for the group stages. The club advanced to the knockout phase after their 4–2 win over Gent in Stockholm, securing another 2 million Euros in prize money. The Swedes topped their group with one game to spare after they came from 2–0 down away against Molde to record a 3–2 win, with Haris Radetinac scoring the winner. They ended up on 16 points, 8 clear of Gent on second place and 9 of Molde in third. They got drawn against the polish club Lech Poznan in the round of 16.

Their domestic 2022–2023 season saw Djurgården securing a European qualifying spot in the 2023–24 UEFA Conference League, in the third to last game of the Allsvenskan season, after other results went in their favour, they ended in second place. Djurgården sold both their centre backs (Ekdal to Burnley and Hien to Hellas Verona) during/after the 2022–23 campaign, both for around 3 million Euro or 30 million SEK.

New blood

Djurgården signed the highly talented and coveted trio, Wilmer Odefalk 18, and the Bergvall brothers, Theo 18 and Lucas 16 from the talent factory and Stockholm club Brommapojkarna in the winter transfer window before the 2023 campaign. The trio had other interested clubs from both Sweden and major European leagues, but they all chose to stay and play for Djurgården. Isak Alemayehu from the own academy had interested clubs after him but signed a three-year deal with Djurgården, at 16 years old he became one of the youngest players ever to play and make the debut in Allsvenskan this past season in the last game against Mjällby.

European cups and tournaments 

Notes for the abbreviations in the table below:

 1R: First round
 2R: Second round
 QF: Quarter-finals
 PR: Preliminary round
 QR: Qualifying round
 1QR: First qualifying round
 2QR: Second qualifying round
 3QR: Third qualifying round
 PO: Play-off round
 R16: Round of 16

This is Djurgårdens' history in international cups and tournaments, past and forthcoming organised by UEFA. As of March 2023, the club is ranked 92nd by UEFA in its of European football clubs by coefficient, surpassing arch-rivals AIK in the process, and thereby becoming Sweden's second highest ranked team after Malmö FF.

The Royal League is not included since it was not arranged by UEFA and was a tournament for Scandinavian teams only, but the club qualified for the tournament three out of the five years (namely during the seasons 2004–05, 2005–06, and 2007–08).

Supporters and rivalries

Djurgården is one of the most supported clubs in Sweden (with 21 232 paying members and around 10 000 season ticket holders as of 2022/2023), with most of its supporters living in Stockholm and the neighbouring suburbs. Traditionally, the borough of Östermalm is considered to be the club's stronghold (where Stockholms Stadion is located) which is why the stereotypical view of the clubs supporters is, for them to be upper-class since Östermalm is considered one the wealthier parts of the city. However, a 2015 T-shirt campaign suggests that supporters are spread fairly evenly throughout all geographical and socio-economical areas of Stockholm.

Although Djurgården's supporters have been organizing themselves since the late 1940s, with the founding of DIF Supporters Club back in 1947, the 1970s saw singing supporter sections emerging which led to a new supporter club to be founded in 1981, named Blue Saints. The supporter club later changed its name in 1997 to Järnkaminerna (lit. the Iron Furnaces) since the old name was perceived to be associated with violence. Järnkaminerna is Djurgården's official supporters' group with a membership of about 5800.

The 2000s saw the emergence and creation of independent ultras groups. The oldest active ultra group, Ultra Caos Stockholm, formed in 2003 is largely influenced by southern European supporter culture.

In 2005 Fabriken Stockholm was formed and took over the role of creating tifos for the team's games from a former, now dissolved group, Ultras Stockholm, founded in the late 1990s. In 2013 a larger and more open organization (Sofia Tifo) was formed and took charge of the terrace choreography, headed by Ultra Caos Stockholm.

The club's ultras are located in the lower part of Sofialäktaren (the Sofia stand), located in the south part of the stadium. The name comes from a hospital, Sophiahemmet, situated behind the section of Stockholms stadion where the ultras used to stand when Djurgården played there.

Djurgården supporters

Fredrik Reinfeldt, former Prime Minister of Sweden
Joakim Thåström, musician
Stefan Persson, former CEO, chairman of the board and major shareholder of H&M
Christer Fuglesang, astronaut, first Scandinavian in space
Carl XVI Gustaf, king of Sweden
Olof Palme, former Prime Minister of Sweden
Lars Ohly, former leader of Vänsterpartiet

Rivalries
Djurgården's arch-rival is AIK. AIK was founded on 15 February 1891, and Djurgården four weeks later on 12 March, both in Stockholm City Centre. Because of this, games between the teams are called Tvillingderbyt (Derby of the twins) by the media, a name that has not caught on among supporters since they don't view themselves as such. They are also historically the biggest and most successful clubs from Stockholm, with 21 titles won by AIK and 17 by Djurgården. Games between the two teams draw large crowds of rival supporters and can often be highly charged occasions.

Hammarby is the other main rival mostly because of their geographical proximity in central Stockholm, with Djurgården's stronghold in the Östermalm district and Hammarby's in Södermalm. Since 2013, the two teams have shared the same home ground, the Tele2 Arena.

Malmö FF and IFK Göteborg must be viewed the biggest rivals outside of the Stockholm area. The fixtures against these draw almost as much crowd as the derbys, especially the last couple of years. Another rivalry that has come to grow bigger and more intense is with Helsingborg IF, and that after an incident where a Djurgården supporter was beaten to death before the premier of the 2014 season in Helsingborg.

Affiliated schools
These are the schools where lot of the club's junior and academy players go.

Engelbrektsskolan in Östermalm (grade 4–9)
Sjölins Gymnasium in Södermalm (high school)
Stockholms Idrottsgymnasium in Östermalm (high school) 
Gustavsbergs Gymnasium (high school) since 2021/2022

Djurgården have gym/PE teachers working in around 31 different schools around Stockholm as a part of a big project they have together with Djurgårdens hockey section. The goal is to get the city's children to be physically active since children today tend to be less active. The classes Djurgården's teachers have are in addition to the original classes.

Kit

The home shirt has vertical sky and dark blue stripes, hence the club's nickname Blåränderna (the Blue Stripes). The shorts are usually dark blue but have occasionally been white.

Kit manufacturers and sponsors
The club's kit manufacturer, Adidas, presents a new kit every other (even) year. Apart from Adidas, Djurgården has the logos of the following companies visible on their shirt and shorts: Prioritet Finans, a financial-services company; Stadium, a sporting-goods retail chain; Fxoro a financial and trading company; German automakers Volkswagen; Nordic wellness a gym brand and league sponsors Unibet

Crest, colours and name
The first crest of the club was a four-pointed silver star in saltire, which had a shield on it with the letters DIF. This star pre-dates the similar star which Idrottsföreningen Kamraterna adopted and is using to this day. The present crest, in the form of a shield in yellow, red, and blue with the text D.I.F. was adopted in 1896. According to an often-quoted poem by Johan af Klercker from 1908, blue and yellow stand for Sweden and red stands for love. Blue and yellow are also the colours of Stockholm and yellow, red and blue are the colors of the crest of Stockholm County.

The club is named after the city park and borough Djurgården, which originally was a royal hunting park. A direct translation of Djurgården would be "animal garden" or "animal yard". The word djur is cognate with the English word "deer", so "deer garden" may have been the name's original meaning. The IF in Djurgårdens IF stands for sports association, and FF in Djurgårdens IF FF stands for football association.

Djurgården has two nicknames: Järnkaminerna (The Iron Stoves) and Blåränderna (The Blue Stripes).

Stadiums

Djurgården's primary stadium since 2013 is Tele2 Arena. The club's first match at Tele2 was a 1–2 defeat to IFK Norrköping on 31 July 2013, which drew 27,798 people. The current record attendance at Tele2 Arena is 28,258 versus Örebro SK on the last home game of the 2019 season.

Between 1936 and 2013, Djurgården's home ground was Stockholm Olympic Stadium, where the national league and cup games were played. Their secondary venue was Råsunda Stadium, where Stockholm derbies against AIK and Hammarby IF were played. The old Olympic Stadium, built in 1912, didn't fulfil UEFA's stadium requirements and therefore international cup games were also played at Råsunda. The club's record attendance at the Olympic Stadium is at least 21,995 against AIK on 16 August 1946. Djurgården's record attendance at Råsunda is 50,750 against IFK Göteborg on 11 October 1959.

The club's first stadium was Stockholms idrottspark where the club played from 1899 until 1906, when it moved to the newly built Östermalm Athletic Grounds. However, in August 1910 Djurgården signed a 25-year contract with the Stockholm City Council to build a stadium in Traneberg, a district west of the inner city. Tranebergs Idrottsplats was finished in October 1911 and inaugurated by Crown Prince Gustaf Adolf. The contract expired in 1935, and with the City Council intending to establish residential housing on the site, Djurgården moved to the Stockholm Olympic Stadium in 1936, where the club had played previously on several occasions after the construction of the stadium in 1912.

As attendances increased in the latter half of the 1940s, the club decided to play some games at the newer and larger Råsunda Stadium. And as Djurgården climbed in the league table at the beginning of the 1950s, all games were played at Råsunda. But by the end of the 1960s, Djurgården returned to the Olympic stadium, and soon all games were played there, with the exception of derbies.

The club's achievements in the early 2000s drew larger attendances which led Djurgården to plan for a new stadium with modern facilities and individual seats. Along with political promises in 2006, Djurgården aimed for a rehaul of Stockholm Olympic Stadium and later an entirely new stadium at Östermalms IP. These plans were abandoned in December 2011 as the building costs exceeded the club's financial capabilities. New stadium requirements from the Swedish Football Association also did not allow Djurgården to play at the Olympic Stadium after 2013. Thus, the club board made the decision to move to Tele2 Arena for the 2013 season.

Youth academy
The youth academy is located at Hjorthagens IP. In December 2012, an indoor arena named "Johan Björkmans hall" with one regulation-size turf and two smaller turfs was built at Hjorthagens IP which enables football training all year around.
In 2007 Djurgården invested 65 million SEK (roughly 7 million Euro) in their youth academy, which former director of sports, Göran Aral, described as a unique investment by a Swedish club. In 2015 the training ground for the first team was renovated which enabled the PA19 and PA17 teams to be training at Kaknäs IP and therefore come closer to the first team. The academy has produced players like Simon Tibbling, Emil Bergström and Christian Rubio Sivodedov. They recently changed the name of the academy teams from U to PA/FA, meaning boys academy and girls academy. The most recent graduates from the own academy, who made it to the first team is Oscar Pettersson and Isak Alemayehu.

Players

First-team squad

Out on loan

Notable players

List criteria:

 player has been named Allsvenskan Top Goalscorer of the year, or
 player has won Guldbollen, or
 player is one of the 12 players named as "DIF-heroes" on the official club website. or
 player has gained 100 caps or more for his country.

Management and boardroom

Management
A list of the staff working with and around the first team squad. As of 30/08 2022

Boardroom
As of 27/01 2022 Djurgården are to 100% owned by the members of the club, meaning they have the power to choose the boardroom and vote in important questions, they run the club with democracy.

Managerial history

It is not known for sure who was the team's manager until 1922, though it is believed that Birger Möller was in charge during a part of the club's first decades.

Honours

 Swedish Champions
Winners (12): 1912, 1915, 1917, 1920, 1954–55, 1959, 1964, 1966, 2002, 2003, 2005, 2019

League
 Allsvenskan:
Winners (8): 1954–55, 1959, 1964, 1966, 2002, 2003, 2005, 2019
 Runners-up (4): 1962, 1967, 2001, 2022

 Superettan:
 Winners (1): 2000
 Division 1 Norra:
 Winners (3): 1987, 1994, 1998
 Runners-up (1): 1997
 Svenska Serien:
 Runners-up (1): 1911–12

Cups
 Svenska Cupen:
 Winners (5): 1989–90, 2002, 2004, 2005, 2017–18
 Runners-up (4): 1951, 1974–75, 1988–89, 2012–13
 Svenska Mästerskapet:
 Winners (4): 1912, 1915, 1917, 1920
 Runners-up (7): 1904, 1906, 1909, 1910, 1913, 1916, 1919
 Allsvenskan play-offs:
 Runners-up (1): 1988
 Corinthian Bowl:
 Winners (1): 1910
 Runners-up (2): 1908, 1911
 Rosenska Pokalen:
 Runners-up (1): 1902
 Wicanderska Välgörenhetsskölden:
 Winners (4): 1907, 1910, 1913, 1915
 Runners-up (3): 1908, 1914, 1916
 Nordic Cup:
 Runners-up (1): 1959–62

Records

 Victory, Allsvenskan: 9–1 vs. Hammarby IF (13 August 1990)
 Loss, Allsvenskan: 1–11 vs. IFK Norrköping (14 October 1945)
 Highest attendance, Råsunda Stadium: 50,750 vs. IFK Göteborg (11 October 1959)
 Highest attendance, Stockholms Stadion: 21,995 vs. AIK (16 August 1946)
 Highest attendance, Tele2 Arena: 28,258 vs. Örebro SK (28 October 2019)
 Most appearances, Allsvenskan: 312, Sven Lindman (1965–80)
 Most goals scored, Allsvenskan: 70, Gösta 'Knivsta' Sandberg (1951–66)
Record transfer fee paid – 14 million Swedish krona, Thiago Quirino from Atlético Mineiro (winter of 2006)
Record transfer fee received – 50 million Swedish krona, Marcus Danielson to Dalian Professional (winter of 2020)

Most appearances

Competitive matches only, includes appearances as substitute. Numbers in brackets indicate goals scored.

Footnotes

References

External links

Official websites
 Djurgården Fotboll – official site
 Djurgården Fotboll – at the UEFA official site
 Djurgården Fotboll – at the Allsvenskan official site

Supporter websites
 Järnkaminerna Stockholm – official supporter club site
 Djurgårdens Supporters Club – supporter site

 
Allsvenskan clubs
Association football clubs established in 1899
Football clubs in Stockholm
Football
1899 establishments in Sweden
Football clubs in Stockholm County
Sport in Stockholm
Svenska Cupen winners
Sports companies of Sweden